Journeyman Pictures may refer to:
 
 Journeyman Pictures, a US based independent feature film production company founded by producer Paul Mezey
 Journeyman Pictures, a UK based independent film distribution company founded by former video journalist Mark Stucke